Oliver Peak is a prominent peak (2,410 m) located 4 nautical miles (7 km) north-northwest of Round Mountain in the Asgard Range, Victoria Land. Njord Valley is located to the east.

Oliver Peak was named by the Advisory Committee on Antarctic Names (US-ACAN) for Leon Oliver of New Zealand, who participated in the international Dry Valley Drilling Project as chief driller (1973–74) and drilling superintendent (1974–75).

References 

Mountains of the Asgard Range
McMurdo Dry Valleys